Ishgah (also Romanized as Īshgāh; also known as Īshkā’) is a village in Baz Kia Gurab Rural District, in the Central District of Lahijan County, Gilan Province, Iran. At the 2006 census, its population was 373, in 102 families.

References 

Populated places in Lahijan County